Patrick Brown is a British-Canadian journalist based in and living in Beijing, China. He has worked for both CBC News and Global News.

Life and career
Brown was born in Birmingham, England. After his GCE joined VSO, Sierra Leone (West Africa) he attended Cambridge.  He holds a master's degree in social anthropology from Downing College, Cambridge. He is fluent in French and Mandarin.

He moved to Canada in 1970. He was a computer systems analyst, teacher and freelance journalist before joining Radio Canada International as a news editor.

He went to Montreal to work as a reporter with CBC Radio in 1976 and as national reporter in 1978.

He is a co-author, along with Rae Murphy and Robert Chodos, of the 1976 book Winners, Losers, which covered the 1975–76 Progressive Conservative Party of Canada leadership campaign and convention.

Since 1980 Brown has been posted outside of Canada for both CBC Radio, CBC TV and briefly with Global News. He was a correspondent in London (1980–1990), Beijing (1990–1996, for CBC), Delhi (1997–1999) and Beijing (2011–2012, for Global).

Brown is now independent documentary-maker and files stories for the CBC based in China and Canada (Vancouver BC).

He published his memoir, Butterfly Mind, in 2009.

Publications
Winners, Losers. Toronto: Lorimer, 1976. with Robert Chodos and Rae Murphy. .
Butterfly Mind: : Revolution, Recovery, and One Reporter's Road to Understanding China. Toronto: House of Anansi, 2009. .

Awards
 Gemini Award for Best Reportage - 1993.
 Gemini Award for Best Coverage (Afghanistan) 1992.
 Gemini Award for Best Coverage (Afghanistan) 2002.
 Canadian Journalism Foundation Lifetime Achievement Award 2011.

References

External links
 Patrick Brown at CBC
 Patrick Brown's Twitter
 Interview with George Stroumboulopoulos on CBC News: The Hour (June 1, 2006)

Canadian television reporters and correspondents
Alumni of Downing College, Cambridge
Canadian Screen Award winning journalists
Living people
English emigrants to Canada
Year of birth missing (living people)
People from Birmingham, West Midlands
Global Television Network people